The Berowra Valley Regional Park is in the Hornsby Shire in Sydney, Australia. Most of what was previously the regional park was placed in the Berowra Valley National Park in September 2012. Only a small portion remains as the regional park.

See also

 Berowra Valley National Park
 Protected areas of New South Wales

References

External links
 
 
 
 
  [CC-By-SA]
  [CC-By-SA]

Regional parks in New South Wales
Hornsby Shire